Thê Húc Bridge (chữ Nôm: 橋棲旭), is a footbridge over Hoàn Kiếm Lake within Hanoi, Vietnam.

History

In 1865, during the reign of Tự Đức, the scholar Nguyễn Văn Siêu commissioned a bridge connecting the bank of the river with the Temple of the Jade Mountain.  He named it "Thê Húc" (meaning "a drop of light rests" or "Condensation of aura"). 

The bridge has undergone full reconstruction twice since it was first built. The first time was in 1897 during the reign of Thành Thái. The second time was initiated in 1952 under then-mayor Thẩm Hoàng Tín after the bridge collapsed on New Year's Eve due to an overabundance of visitors to Temple of the Jade Mountain. Under the supervision of architect Nguyễn Bá Lăng, the bridge was rebuilt in 1953, with the foundation recast in cement instead of wood.

Thê Húc Bridge has also been set on fire in 1887 in an act of arson. During their colonial rule, the French assigned Temple of the Jade Mountain to be a residence of a French mandarin and banned worship at the site. In defiance, two students, 17-year-old Nguyễn Văn Minh and 14-year-old Đức Nghi plotted to burn bridge. The fire scared the French enough for them withdraw from staying in that temple, as well as withdrawing the French troops stationed at Trấn Quốc temple, Châu Long Pagoda and the Yên Phụ village communal house. However, when the plot was discovered, Minh was arrested, imprisoned, and finally executed in 1888 at the age of 18. 

It was believed to be first photographed by Charles-Édouard Hocquard, who captured the bridge in its 19th century state between 1884 to 1885.

Description

The bridge now consists of 15 spans with 32 round wooden pillars arranged in 16 pairs. The bridge deck is paved and the surface railings are painted dark red, with the words 棲旭橋 (Thê Húc Kiều) gilded. Although still hallowed to a certain extent, it is now widely visited by a broad range of locals and tourists who purchase a ticket.

Gallery

References

1865 establishments in Vietnam
Bridges completed in 1865
Bridges in Vietnam
Buildings and structures in Hanoi
Pedestrian bridges in Vietnam
Tourist attractions in Hanoi